The Lower Saxony State Prize has been awarded by the State of Lower Saxony since 2002. From 1978 to 1999 it was called the Lower Saxony Prize. The award is presented by the Prime Minister of Lower Saxony. The prize has been awarded to personalities who have made outstanding services to the state through their outstanding work in the fields of culture, women, social affairs, science, the environment or the economy. The award is endowed with €35,000 and can be shared. The award winners are selected by a voluntary jury consisting of up to ten people from Lower Saxony.

Recipients Lower Saxony Prize 

 2000 award not given
 2001 Timm Ulrichs, Jürgen Großmann

Recipients Lower Saxony State Prize
 
 2002 Axel Haverich
 2003 Georg Baselitz
 2004 Peter Gruss
 2005 Hans Georg Näder, Christiane Iven
 2006 Gerhard Steidl, Christian von Bar
 2007 Heinz Rudolf Kunze, Eva-Maria Neher
 2008 Stefan Hell
 2009 Aloys Wobben, Heinrich Riebesehl
 2010 Wilhelm Krull, Ulrich Tukur
 2012 Georg Klein, Ulrich Reimers
 2014 Gudrun Schröfel, Scorpions (Rudolf Schenker, Klaus Meine und Matthias Jabs)
 2016 Bruce Allen, Alessandra Buonanno, Karsten Danzmann
 2018 Stefan Aust, Jan-Dieter Bruns
 2020 Igor Levit, Edith Bischof

References 

Awards for contributions to culture
German awards
Awards established in 1978